Miss Valentine is an international gymnastics tournament in Tartu, Estonia. The event was first held in 1995 and, as of 2020, has been hosted annually. The event hosts rhythmic gymnastics and aesthetic group gymnastics competitions.

FIG World Cup
In 2013 for the first time Miss Valentine hosted a Rhythmic Gymnastics World Cup stage.

Grand Prix
In 2020, Miss Valentine served as the third stage of the Rhythmic Gymnastics Grand Prix series. It was the first time that the Nordic and Baltic regions received a Grand Prix stage.

See also
2013 FIG Rhythmic Gymnastics World Cup series
List of events at the Rhythmic Gymnastics Grand Prix series

References

External links
 Home page
 Facebook page

Rhythmic gymnastics competitions
Sports competitions in Estonia